A Chevalley scheme in algebraic geometry was a precursor notion of scheme theory.

Let X be a separated integral noetherian scheme, R its function field. If we denote by  the set of subrings  of R, where x runs through X (when , we denote  by ),  verifies the following three properties
 For each , R is the field of fractions of M.

Originally, Chevalley also supposed that R was an extension of finite type of a field K and that the 's were algebras of finite type over a field too (this simplifies the second condition above).

Bibliography

 Online 

Scheme theory